Erythrina acanthocarpa (common name - Tambuki thorn) is a species of Erythrina in the family Fabaceae, and was first described in 1835 by Ernst Heinrich Friedrich Meyer. It is found in South Africa, where it is native to the Cape and  Northern Provinces, but introduced in Free State.  It is a succulent, nitrogen-fixing shrub.

Etymology 
The species epithet, acanthocarpos, derives from two Greek words, akanthos (spine, thorn) and karpos (fruit) and thus describes the plant as having spiny fruits.

Conservation status 
Under the South African Red Listing of taxa under threat, it is listed as being of "least concern."

References

External links 

 JSTOR Global Plants: Erythrina acanthocarpa

Taxa named by Ernst Heinrich Friedrich Meyer

acanthocarpa
Plants described in 1835